Craig Ross (born 18 September 1980) is a New Zealand former cricketer. He played in two first-class matches for Canterbury in 2006.

See also
 List of Canterbury representative cricketers

References

External links
 

1980 births
Living people
New Zealand cricketers
Canterbury cricketers
People from Lincoln, New Zealand
Cricketers from Canterbury, New Zealand